There were two battles of Faringdon:

 An 1145 battle between Stephen, King of England and Empress Matilda forces
 An 1645 battle in Faringdon, Oxfordshire, as part of the English Civil War